Kenneth Cheruiyot (born August 2, 1974) is an athlete from Kenya who specialises in long-distance running. He is most famous for winning the Rotterdam Marathon in 2000. He finished second in the event in 2001 and 2002. In 2002 he fell to ground and broke his arm after 10 kilometers of running, but still managed to finish and even grab silver.

Biography
At the 1997 IAAF World Half Marathon Championships Cheruiyot was third, behind fellow Kenyans Shem Kororia and Moses Tanui. He represented Kenya at the 2000 Summer Olympics in Sydney, but failed to finish marathon race.

He won the Monaco Marathon in 1999, making a new race record by running 2:11:26.

He was married to Nancy Lagat, an Olympic gold medalist.

Achievements

References

External links

1974 births
Living people
Kenyan male long-distance runners
Kenyan male marathon runners
Athletes (track and field) at the 2000 Summer Olympics
Olympic athletes of Kenya